Michael Ira Rosen (born March 7, 1938) is an American mathematician who works on algebraic number theory, arithmetic theory of function fields, and arithmetic algebraic geometry.

Biography
Rosen earned a bachelor's degree from Brandeis University in 1959 and a PhD from Princeton University in 1963 under John Coleman Moore with thesis Representations of twisted group rings. He is a mathematics professor at Brown University.

Rosen is known for his textbooks, especially for the book with co-author Kenneth Ireland on number theory, which was inspired by ideas of André Weil; this book, A Classical Introduction to Modern Number Theory gives an introduction to zeta functions of algebraic curves, the Weil conjectures, and the arithmetic of elliptic curves.

For his essay Niels Hendrik Abel and equations of the fifth degree Rosen received the 1999 Chauvenet Prize.

Publications

Books
 with Kenneth Ireland: A classical introduction to modern number theory, Springer, Graduate Texts in Mathematics, 1982, 2nd edn. 1992,  (Rosen and Ireland earlier published Elements of number theory; including an introduction to equations over finite fields, Bogden and Quigley, 1972)
 Number theory in function fields, Springer, Graduate Texts in Mathematics, 2002,

Articles

References

External links
 Michael Rosen – Homepage at Brown University
 
 

Living people
20th-century American mathematicians
21st-century American mathematicians
Number theorists
1938 births
Mathematicians from New York (state)

Brandeis University alumni
Princeton University alumni
Brown University faculty